Sabra District is a district of Tlemcen Province in north-western Algeria.

Geo-co-ordinates

Latitude = 34.6780, Longitude = -1.3662
Lat    = 34 degrees,   40.7 minutes   North
Long = 1 degrees,   22.0 minutes   West

References

Districts of Tlemcen Province